Bvt. Maj. Gen. William Denison Whipple (August 2, 1826 – April 1, 1902) was an officer of the U.S. Army who fought against the native Americans in the New Mexico Territory and served the Union during the American Civil War.

Biography 
Whipple was born in Nelson, New York on August 2, 1826 to Jerusha Whipple. He entered West Point in 1847 before graduating on July 1, 1851 and was assigned to the 3rd U.S. Infantry Regiment as a second lieutenant. During his time there he would be treated for phlegmon three times, catarrhs twice, diarrhea twice, and several other diseases. He graduated near the bottom of his class, but would go on to have a prominent career.

In the spring of 1852, Whipple marched a detachment of recruits from Newport Barracks to Jefferson Barracks, joining a larger detachment and taking a steamer to Fort Leavenworth before going on to join the 3rd regiment in the New Mexico Territory. He was promoted to first lieutenant on December 31, 1856 and served frontier duty across New Mexico until 1860. While there Whipple participated in the Gila Expedition of 1857 against the apaches, the Navajo conflict of 1858, from Fort Defiance, and the Second Battle of Fort Defiance on April 29, 1860. Whipple would also study Navajo vocabulary for the U.S. military over the course of his service there.

American Civil War 
In 1860, Whipple's regiment was ordered to Texas where he would serve as a quartermaster in Indianola. He would remain there until the Twiggs agreement the following year. Whipple, still in Indianola, would try to get the troops under his command back to the North, however, they were captured at their post in by Van Dorn due to delays by other officers and the Confederates seizing schooners hired by Whipple to take the troops back North. 

Whipple would escape captivity and make his was to New Orleans. He traveled under an assumed identity with a Confederate regiment, who he gleaned information from, until reaching Richmond after which he went to Washington, D.C. and turned himself over to the quartermaster-general. After returning Whipple served on the staff of Colonel David Hunter during the First Battle of Bull Run. During the battle, Whipple's horse was shot out from under him.

The next assignment Whipple received was to organize the staffs of Major General John A. Dix in Baltimore and General John Wool in Ft. Monroe. Whipple served as an Adjutant General throughout 1862 before his promotion to brigadier general of volunteers on July 17, 1863. The appointment would expire due to lack of confirmation, but he would prevent a draft riot in Philadelphia while commanding the Lehigh District of Pennsylvania. He would also quelled violence from a clandestine organization of coal miners called the Molly Maguires through his vigilance. Despite the promotion, in October of 1863 there was a question of whether his health was adequate for him to be assigned to duty.

Whipple was then sent west to serve as assistant adjutant general for the Army of the Cumberland on November 12, 1863. He would then join Major General Thomas as his Chief of Staff from December 5, 1863 to June 27, 1865. During this period he would be reappointed and confirmed to the rank of Brigadier General in September of 1864 and be present at the Battle of Missionary Ridge, the Nashville Campaign, the Chattanooga Campaign, and the Siege of Atlanta, among others.  

Whipple would also serve as an aide-de-camp to General Sherman for five years, Chief of Staff for the Military Division of Tennessee, and was brevetted to major general in the regular army in March of 1865.Following the Civil War, Whipple continued to serve in the United States Army Adjutant General's Corps for a variety of divisions and departments beginning in 1878, eventually receiving the rank of colonel in 1887, before retiring in August of 1890.

Whipple would contract a case of pneumonia which he, after several days, would die of on April 1, 1902 in New York City, where he had settled down. He was later buried in Arlington National Cemetery.

Family 
Whipple married Caroline Mary Cooke, of Philadelphia, in 1854 while serving in the New Mexico Territory. They would have two children, Herbert and Marion, both of whom survived Whipple. Herbert would become a captain in the 3rd U.S. Cavalry while his daughter, Marion, would marry Charles Deering.

References 

1826 births
1902 deaths

People from Madison County, New York
United States Military Academy alumni
United States Army personnel of the Indian Wars
Union Army generals
United States Army colonels
Deaths from pneumonia in New York City
Burials at Arlington National Cemetery